Redeemer Lutheran Church may refer to:

 Redeemer Lutheran Church (Victoria, British Columbia)
 Redeemer Lutheran Church (Elmhurst, Illinois)
 Lutheran Church of the Redeemer, Jerusalem